Andrew or Andy Cohen may refer to:

Media
 Andy Cohen (born 1968), American television executive and pop culture blogger
 Andrew J. Cohen, American screenwriter and film director
 Andrew Cohen (filmmaker) (born 1965), American independent filmmaker and journalist

Politics
 Andrew Cohen (colonial administrator) (1909–1968), former governor of Uganda
 Andrew Cohen (politician) (born 1969), American politician in New York City

Sports
 Andy Cohen (baseball) (1904–1988), Major League second baseman
 Andrew Cohen (footballer) (born 1981), Maltese

Other
 Andrew Cohen (journalist) (born 1955), Canadian
 Andrew Cohen (spiritual teacher) (born 1955), American
 Andrew Cohen (poker player) (born c. 1969), American
 Andrew Cohen (businessman) (born 1977), Australian entrepreneur
 Andy Cohen (architect), American Co-CEO of Gensler
 Andy Cohen, guitarist for the band Silkworm

See also

 Andrew (disambiguation)
 Andy (disambiguation)
 Cohen (disambiguation)